The Treasure of Abbot Thomas is a 1974 supernatural drama produced by the BBC as part of its A Ghost Story for Christmas series. Running at 37 minutes and directed by Lawrence Gordon Clark, it was written by John Bowen with an atmospheric musical score by Geoffrey Burgon. Based on the 1904 short story "The Treasure of Abbot Thomas" by M. R. James, the drama was originally broadcast on 23 December 1974 and starred Michael Bryant and Paul Lavers.

Synopsis

In 1859 the Rev Justin Somerton (Michael Bryant), an academic clergyman and Medievalist, and his aristocratic protégé Peter, Lord Dattering (Paul Lavers) expose two fraudulent mediums, Mr and Mrs Tyson, who claim they are able to communicate with the recently deceased husband of Lady Dattering (Virginia Balfour). 

Somerton tells Dattering about his researches into the history of an ancient local monastery. He tells of a supposed cache of gold said to have been hidden by one Abbot Thomas, a disgraced former churchman and alchemist who, according to legend, was carried off by the Devil in 1529. Together, they follow the clues during which they visit a church where they discover hidden messages in an ancient stained-glass window referring  to the location of the treasure hidden long ago by the evil Abbot Thomas. Despite the warning that the Abbot had  "set a guardian" to protect his treasure, Somerton sets out to unearth it - and discovers its horrific secret.

Cast
Michael Bryant as Rev Justin Somerton
Paul Lavers as Peter, Lord Dattering
Frank Mills as Mr Tyson 
Sheila Dunn as Mrs Tyson 
John Herrington as Abbot Thomas 
Virginia Balfour as Lady Dattering
Peggy Aitchison as landlady

Adaptation
In creating his adaptation, Bowen changed a number of elements of M. R. James's story, such as removing Somerton's servant Brown from the story and adding another character – Peter, Lord Dattering (Paul Lavers) – as Somerton's protégé, with whom he shares his investigation. Unlike James’s original story, the television version is not told in flashback, and includes a scene in which Somerton exposes two fraudulent mediums, which acts as a demonstration of Somerton's rational approach to the supernatural.

For The Treasure of Abbot Thomas, Clark recalls John Bowen's script "took some liberties with the story—which made it for the better I think...It's really quite a funny story until it gets nasty, although the threat is always there. James has a mordant sense of humour, and it's good to translate that into cinematic terms when you can. I'd always wanted to do a medium scene, and John came up with a beauty."

A parody, written by Stephen Sheridan and named The Teeth of Abbot Thomas, was made for radio broadcast and is currently available on YouTube.

Locations

Although James’s original story was set in Germany, for budgetary reasons in the television version the action was relocated to England. Clark used the grounds of Wells Cathedral in Somerset for the entrance to the well where Abbot Thomas hid his treasure. Wells Cathedral Chapter House and its adjoining steps also were used in various scenes. The house featured is Orchardleigh, on the outskirts of Frome - also in Somerset. The 13th-century church of St Mary, Orchardleigh also featured in the production, as did  Vicars' Close in Wells, Somerset.

References

External links

Adaptations of works by M. R. James
BBC television dramas
Television shows based on short fiction
A Ghost Story for Christmas
1974 television films